James Spence may refer to:

 James Spence (sailor) (1875–1946), Olympic sailor from the Great Britain
 James Spence (surgeon) (1812–1882), Scottish surgeon
 James Calvert Spence (1892–1954),  British paediatrician
 James Houston Spence (1867–1939), Canadian lawyer and Senator
 James MacDonald Spence, lawyer and Justice of the Ontario Superior Court of Justice
 Jamie Spence (born 1963), English golfer
 James Spence, Scottish author of the 2009 book Silly Beggar

See also
 Jim Spence (disambiguation)